The South African type TL tender was a steam locomotive tender.

Type TL tenders were rebuilt from Type TJ and Type TM tenders which had entered service between 1909 and 1912. The rebuilding resulted in a tender with a larger coal bunker.

Origin
Type TJ tenders entered service on the Natal Government Railways (NGR) in 1909 and 1910, as tenders to the first five locomotives of the Class B  of 1909 and the Classes A  and B  of 1910.

Type TM tenders entered service on the NGR and South African Railways (SAR) in 1911 and 1912, as tenders to the last 25 locomotives of the NGR Class B  and the SAR Class 3B.

These locomotives and tender were designed by NGR Locomotive Superintendent D.A. Hendrie and built by the North British Locomotive Company and the NGR.

Rebuilding
From c. 1925, several of the Types TJ and TM tenders were completely rebuilt by the South African Railways (SAR) by mounting a new upper structure on the existing underframe. These rebuilt tenders had a more modern appearance, with flush sides all the way to the top of the coal bunker. They were designated Type TL.

The program to rebuild several older tender types with new upper structures was begun by Colonel F.R. Collins DSO, who approved several of the detailed drawings for the work during his term in office as Chief Mechanical Engineer (CME) of the SAR from 1922 to 1929. It was continued by his successor, A.G. Watson.

Characteristics

Classification letters
Since many tender types are interchangeable between different locomotive classes and types, a tender classification system was adopted by the SAR. The first letter of the tender type indicates the classes of engines to which it could be coupled. The "T_" tenders could be used with the locomotive classes as shown, although the engine drawbar had to be replaced to suit the target engine in some cases.
 NGR Class B 4-8-0 of 1910, SAR Class 1A.
 NGR Class A 4-6-2 of 1910, SAR Class 2C.
 NGR Class B 4-8-2 of 1909, SAR Class 3.
 SAR Class 3B.
 SAR Class MC.

The second letter indicates the tender's water capacity.

Modification

Illustration

References

TL